Knut Casimir Petre (24 April 1831 in Ovansjö, Gävleborg County – 9 September 1889), was a Swedish ironmaster and member of the Riksdag.

Petre owned the blast furnace in Hofors in Torsåker parish, Uppsala. He was a member of parliament for the bourgeoisie estate 1865-1866 and member of the Första kammaren 1867-1877.

References

Sources 
 Förteckning å vällofliga Borgareståndets ledamöter vid lagtima riksdagen i Stockholm år 1865, borgarståndets protokoll 21/10 1865

1831 births
1889 deaths
Members of the Första kammaren
19th-century Swedish politicians